Zingaya was launched in North America on September 14, 2010 at the DEMO conference. Zingaya provides next generation click-to-call services. Using Adobe Flash-based Voice over Internet Protocol technology, the company provides an embedded widget that forwards an end user through a VoIP call to landlines, mobile phones, Skype accounts, or other computers – whichever the website operator has specified. There’s no download, and no phone is required for the caller. A visitor to a website simply clicks the “Call” button on the widget.

In October 2010, Zingaya debuted their Zin.to service, which gives Twitter users the ability to have specific followers call them by clicking on a link that they tweet. Like the Zingaya widget, the caller is calling through their web browser, and the call's recipient can choose where they want the call forwarded to.

References

External links
 

Business software companies
VoIP software
Software companies established in 2009
Software companies based in London